Walter Lambe (1450–1? – after Michaelmas 1504) was an English composer.

His works are well represented in the Eton Choirbook. Also the Lambeth Choirbook and the Caius Choirbook include his works.

Born in Salisbury, elected King's Scholar at Eton College in August 1467 aged 15. By 1477 Lambe was a clerk at Holy Trinity College, Arundel and in 1479 he moved to St George's Chapel, Windsor as a clerk of the choir there.

List of works in Eton Choirbook
 Ascendit Christus
 Gaude flore virginali (lost)
 Magnificat
 Nesciens mater virgo virum
 O Maria plena gratiae
 O Regina caelestis gloriae (lost)
 Salve regina 
 Stella caeli
 Virgo gaude gloriosa (lost)

External links
 Hoasm.org biography

Notes

1450s births
1500s deaths
English classical composers
Renaissance composers
15th-century English people
16th-century English composers
English male classical composers
People educated at Eton College